Sven Goldemann (born 22 June 1969 in Hamburg) is a German curler. He started curling in 1980. At the 2013 Olympic Qualifying Event Goldemann played lead for the John Jahr skipped German men's team. The team finished the round robin in first place with a record of 5-2 and ultimately defeated the team from the Czech Republic to win the event. Goldemann's team went on to represent Germany in the 2014 Winter Olympics, where they finished tenth with a record of 1–8.

References

External links
 

German male curlers
1969 births
Living people
Curlers at the 2014 Winter Olympics
Olympic curlers of Germany
21st-century German people